The 2017 L&T Mumbai Open was a professional tennis tournament played on outdoor hard courts. It was the 2nd edition of the tournament overall, but the first in Mumbai, as the event made its debut in Pune in 2012 but was discontinued thereafter. It is part of the 2017 WTA 125K series. It took place between 20 November to 26 November 2017.

WTA singles main-draw entrants

Seeds

 1 Rankings are as of 13 November 2017.

Other entrants
The following players received wildcards into the singles main draw:
  Rutuja Bhosale
  Zeel Desai
  Ankita Raina
  Karman Thandi

The following players received entry from the qualifying draw:
  Ana Bogdan
  Deniz Khazaniuk
  Hiroko Kuwata
  Alizé Lim

Withdrawals
Before the tournament
  Petra Krejsová →replaced by  Amandine Hesse
  Jasmine Paolini →replaced by  Junri Namigata
  Anna Karolína Schmiedlová →replaced by  Veronika Kudermetova
  İpek Soylu →replaced by  Laura Robson
  Zhu Lin →replaced by  Olga Ianchuk
  Vera Zvonareva →replaced by  Peangtarn Plipuech

WTA doubles main-draw entrants

Seeds

 1 Rankings as of 13 November 2017.

Other entrants

The following team received wildcards into the doubles main draw:

  Riya Bhatia /  Natasha Palha

Champions

Singles

  Aryna Sabalenka def.  Dalila Jakupović, 6–2, 6–3

Doubles

  Victoria Rodríguez /  Bibiane Schoofs def.  Dalila Jakupović /  Irina Khromacheva 7–5, 3–6, [10–7]

External links 
 Official website

2017
Mumbai Open
Mumbai Open